Ranbir Singh or Ranabir Singh may refer to
Ranbir Singh (actor), Indian actor.
Ranbir Singh (general), General Officer Commander-in-Chief Northern Command of the Indian Army
Ranbir Singh (jurist), Vice-Chancellor of National Law University, Delhi
Ranbir Singh (Maharaja) (1830–1885), Maharaja of Jammu and Kashmir
Ranbir Singh Bisht (1928–1998), Indian painter
Ranbir Singh Gangwa (born 1964), Indian politician
Ranbir Singh Jind (1879–1948), Maharaja of Jind
Ranbir Singh Mahendra, Indian politician
Ranabir Singh Thapa, Nepalese Army General, prominent politician and minister of state
Ranbir Singh Suri, Baron Suri (born 1935), Conservative life peer in the United Kingdom's House of Lords
Chaudhary Ranbir Singh Hooda, Indian politician 
Chaudhary Ranbir Singh University in Jind, Haryana, India
Raj Kumar Ranbir Singh, Chief Minister of Manipur, India
Ranbir Singh of Jammu and Kashmir, Maharaja of Jammu and Kashmir from 1856 until his death in 1885.
Ranbir Singh Pora, constituency under Jammu district notified area committee in Jammu district in the Indian Union territory of Jammu and Kashmir.
Rana Ranbir, Indian actor
Rajkumar Ranbir Singh, former Chief Minister of Manipur, India.
 Ranbir Bhullar Punjab MLA from Aam Aadmi Party